This is a list of cities in Ecuador.

List

Alphabetical

 Ambato
 Arajuno
 Archidona
 Atacames
 Azogues
 Babahoyo
 Baeza
 Bahía de Caráquez
 Balao
 Balsas
 Balzar
 Baños de Agua Santa
 Bucay
 Calceta
 Carlos Julio Arosemena Tola
 Catarama
 Chone
 Coca
 Colimes
 Coronel Marcelino Maridueña
 Cuenca
 Daule
 Durán
 El Chaco
 El Empalme
 El Guabo
 El Triunfo
 Esmeraldas
 Gualaquiza
 Guaranda
 Guayaquil
 Huaquillas
 Ibarra
 Isidro Ayora
 Jama
 Jujan
 La Concordia
 La Libertad
 Lago Agrio
 Latacunga
 Limones
 Logroño
 Loja
 Lomas de Sargentillo
 Macas
 Machala
 Manta
 Mera
 Milagro
 Montecristi
 Muisne
 Naranjal
 Nobol
 Nuevo Rocafuerte
 Paján
 Palestina
 Palora
 Pedernales
 Pedro Carbo
 Pichincha
 Piñas
 Playas
 Portovelo
 Portoviejo
 Puerto Ayora
 Puerto Baquerizo Moreno
 Puerto El Carmen de Putumayo
 Puerto López
 Puerto Villamil
 Puyo
 Quevedo
 Quinindé
 Quito (capital)
 Riobamba
 Rioverde
 Rocafuerte
 San Lorenzo
 San Vicente
 Santa Rosa
 Santo Domingo
 Salinas
 Samborondón
 Santa Elena
 Simón Bolívar
 Sucre
 Sucúa
 Tarapoa
 Tena
 Tosagua
 Tulcán
 Valencia
 Ventanas
 Vinces
 Yaguachi
 Yantzaza
 Zamora
 Zaruma

By population

See also
Cantons of Ecuador
Provinces of Ecuador
Lists of cities by country

References

External links

 
Cities
Ecuador
Ecuador